Daniel Ivor Evans CBE (5 July 1900 – 30 July 1962) was an Anglican bishop in South America in the mid 20th century.

Educated at St David’s College, Lampeter, Evans served in the RNVR during World War I; and was made deacon on the Feast of St Thomas (21 December) 1924 and ordained priest the next Advent (20 December 1925) — both times by Edward Bevan, Bishop of Swansea and Brecon, at Brecon Cathedral. He began his career with  Curacies at St John’s, Swansea and St Martin’s, Roath. After this he was Assistant Chaplain at St John’s, Buenos Aires and then Chaplain at Christ Church, Rio de Janeiro before being appointed an Assistant Bishop in The Diocese of Argentina and Eastern South America, with the Falkland Islands in 1939. He was consecrated a bishop on St Matthias' Day (24 February) 1939, by Cosmo Lang, Archbishop of Canterbury, at Westminster Abbey. In 1946 he became its diocesan bishop and died in post.

References

1900 births
1962 deaths
Royal Naval Volunteer Reserve personnel of World War I
Commanders of the Order of the British Empire
20th-century Anglican bishops in South America
Anglican bishops of Argentina